Albinia is a town in Tuscany, central Italy.

Albinia  may also refer to:

 Albinia (1813 ship), a merchant ship of British East India Company
 Albinia gens, the Roman gens
 Alice Albinia, English journalist and author
 Albinia, Queensland, a locality in Australia
 Albinia (name), a female given name

See also
 Albina (disambiguation)
 Albania (disambiguation)